3rd Central Committee may refer to:
Central Committee of the 3rd Congress of the Russian Social Democratic Labour Party, 1905–1906
3rd Central Committee of the Bulgarian Communist Party, 1921–1922
3rd Central Executive Committee of the Chinese Communist Party, 1923–1925
3rd Central Committee of the Communist Party of Cuba, 1986–1991
3rd Central Committee of the Socialist Unity Party of Germany, 1950–1954
3rd Central Committee of the Polish United Workers' Party, 1959–1964
3rd Central Committee of the Romanian Communist Party, 1924–1928
3rd Central Committee of the Lao People's Revolutionary Party, 1982–1986
3rd Central Committee of the Workers' Party of Vietnam, 1960–1976
3rd Central Committee of the Communist Party of Yugoslavia, 1926–1928
3rd Central Committee of the Communist Party of Hungary, 1946–1948
3rd Central Committee of the Workers' Party of Korea, 1956–1961